Samuel Atrous (born 15 February 1990) is a French professional footballer who plays as a goalkeeper for Championnat National 3 club Wasquehal.

References

External links 

 

1990 births
Living people
Sportspeople from Nord (French department)
French footballers
Association football goalkeepers
Championnat National 3 players
RC Lens players
Aviron Bayonnais FC players
Iris Club de Croix players
Wasquehal Football players
FC Chambly Oise players
AS Beauvais Oise players
Championnat National 2 players
Championnat National players
Ligue 2 players
Ligue 1 players
People from Roncq
Footballers from Hauts-de-France